Chōkai Maru was an auxiliary patrol boat of the Imperial Japanese Navy during World War II.

History
Chōkai Maru was laid down on 14 September 1936 at the shipyard of Mitsubishi Jukogyo Hikoshima Zosensho. She was launched on 28 June 1936 and completed on 15 February 1937. On 5 September 1941, she was requisitioned by the Imperial Japanese Navy and converted to an auxiliary patrol boat. On 10 May 1945 she was struck from the Navy list.

References

1936 ships
Ships built by Mitsubishi Heavy Industries
Maritime incidents in March 1945